The following table lists the 34 cities, towns and villages in Gifu Prefecture with a population of at least 10,000 on October 1, 2020, according to the 2020 Census. The table also gives an overview of the evolution of the population since the 1995 census.

List

References 

Gifu Prefecture cities